The Kabul River, the classical Cophen , is a  river that emerges in the Sanglakh Range of the Hindu Kush mountains in the northeastern part of Maidan Wardak Province, Afghanistan. It is separated from the watershed of the Helmand River by the Unai Pass. The Kabul River empties into the Indus River near Attock, Pakistan. It is the main river in eastern Afghanistan and the Khyber Pakhtunkhwa province of Pakistan.

Course
In Khyber Pakhtunkhwa, the river passes through the cities of Peshawar, Charsadda, and Nowshera. A majority of the Kabul River’s water originates from the snow and glaciers of Chitral District, out of which it flows into Afghanistan. In its upper reaches it is known as the Sarchashma. The major tributaries of the Kabul River are the Logar, Panjshir, Alingar, Surkhab, Kunar, Bara, and Swat rivers.

Hydrology
The Kabul River is little more than a trickle for most of the year, but swells in summer due to melting snows in the Hindu Kush Range. Its largest tributary is the Kunar River, which starts out as the Mastuj River, flowing from the Chiantar glacie in Brughil valley in Chitral, Pakistan and after flowing south into Afghanistan it is met by the Bashgal river flowing from Nurestan. The Kunar meets the Kabul near Jalalabad. In spite of the Kunar carrying more water than the Kabul, the river continues as the Kabul River after this confluence, mainly for the political and historical significance of the name.

Dams
The Kabul River is impounded by several dams that were constructed in the 20th century. Three dams are located in the Kabul and Nangarhar provinces of Afghanistan, including the Surobi dam, a hydroelectric source for Kabul constructed 1957 with assistance by Germany, the Naghlu dam, which was later built by Soviet scientists in the 1960s, and the Darunta dam. The Warsak Dam is also in the Valley of Peshawar in Pakistan, approximately 20 km northwest of the city of Peshawar.

History

Expedition of Alexander the Great into Asia

In Arrian's The Campaigns of Alexander, the River Kabul is referred to as Κωφήν Kōphēn (Latin spelling Cophen).

Modern era
Since the 1990s, the river has experienced substantial droughts in summer. In approximately March 2019, ten of thousands of gallons of untreated sewage from the Makroyan Waste Water Treatment Plant has been dumped into the Kabul River each month, reportedly causing gastrointestinal issues among the 3,000 families that live along the river.

Etymology

In Sanskrit and Avestan
The word Kubhā which is the ancient name of the river is both a Sanskrit and Avestan word. The word later changed to Kābul.<ref>{{cite book |title=The History and Culture of the Indian People : The Vedic age| author =Ramesh Chandra Majumdar, Achut Dattatrya Pusalker, A. K. Majumdar, Dilip Kumar Ghose, Bharatiya Vidya Bhavan, Vishvanath Govind Dighe Published by Bharatiya Vidya Bhavan|year=1962|page =247|quote=The Kubha is the modern Kabul river which flows into the Indus a little above Attock and receives at Prang the joint flow of its tributaries the Swat (Swastu)  and Gauri}}</ref>

Al-Biruni
Al-Biruni also called it "the River of Ghorwand".

The Kabul River later gave its name to the region and to the settlement of Kabul.

Institution Leadership
Kabul River Basin (KRB) is a government authority under the Ministry of Energy and Water (MEW) of the Government of the Islamic Republic of Afghanistan (GoIRA). Based on the Water Law it was created. The recent Director General of this major water institution was Jalal Naser Faqiryar, who brought positive changes, contributed a lot to the transparency, basin development, and applicable policies, especially river basin management which had positive impacts and results.

Gallery

See also
 List of rivers of Afghanistan
 List of rivers of Pakistan

References

External links
Kabul River. Encyclopaedia Iranica''. 

 
Rivers of Afghanistan
Rivers of Pakistan
Tributaries of the Indus River
International rivers of Asia
Rigvedic rivers
Landforms of Kabul Province
Landforms of Nangarhar Province
Rivers of Khyber Pakhtunkhwa
Rivers of Punjab (Pakistan)
Jalalabad
Kabul
Indus basin
Rivers in Buddhism